Rigert is a German surname. Notable people with the surname include:

Alois Rigert (1906–?), Swiss weightlifter
David Rigert (born 1947), Russian weightlifter
Yelena Rigert (born 1983), Russian hammer thrower

German-language surnames